The boys' individual archery event at the 2010 Summer Youth Olympics was part of the archery programme. It took place at the Kallang Field. Ranking Round was on 18 August 2010. First elimination round took place on 18 August, and eights, quarterfinal, semifinals and medals matches were on 21 August. All archery was done at a range of 70 metres, with targets 1.22 metres in diameter.

Results

Ranking Round

Draw

Finals

Top Half

Bottom Half

References

External links
Ranking Round results
Elimination Bracket
Finals Bracket
Results Summary
 

Archery at the 2010 Summer Youth Olympics